Francis Scott McBride (July 28, 1872 – April 23, 1955) was a Presbyterian minister active in the Anti-Saloon League. He featured on the cover of Time magazine on 3 June 1929.

Early life and education 
McBride was born in Carroll County, Ohio on July 29, 1872, to Francis McBride, who was an iron molder, and Harriet Miller. He attended Muskingum College, where he received a B.S. in 1898, and United Presbyterian Theological School for three years. In 1901, he was ordained.

Anti-Saloon League 
After an eight years in the United Presbyterian Church of Kittanning Pennsylvania and a two years at Monmouth, Illinois, McBride was selected into the Anti-Saloon League in 1911. He became assistant superintendent in 1912 and then held the position of superintendent for the next twelve years. In 1924, he became national superintendent replacing Purley Baker.

After Prohibition was repealed, McBride remained the national superintendent.

References

External links 
 
 Francis Scott McBride 
 PROHIBITION: New Lobbyist Time Monday, September 26, 1927
 Radio addresses by Hon. John J. Lentz and Dr. Francis Scott McBride
 Temperance and Prohibition Papers, 1830 – 1933 

1872 births
1955 deaths
People from Carroll County, Ohio
Muskingum University alumni
American Presbyterians
American temperance activists